The Swan egg is a Fabergé egg, one in a series of fifty-two jewelled eggs made under the supervision of Peter Carl Fabergé. Commissioned in 1906 by Tsar Nicholas II, the egg was presented to the Dowager Empress Maria Feodorovna on Easter that year for her 40th wedding anniversary.

Design 
The egg is made of mauve enamel, with gold trim. On the exterior is a twisted ribbon trellis design of rose-cut diamonds, as well as a portrait diamond on the top inscribed "1906". Another portrait diamond on the other end once held the Imperial monograph. The "surprise" that came inside the egg is a miniature gold and silver swan on a "lake" of aquamarine. By winding a gear beneath one of the wings, the swan's mechanical neck and wings move. In Russia, the swan is considered a symbol of family life and the permanence of the bond of marriage.

The miniature swan is modeled after James Cox’s Silver Swan, an automaton dating from the 18th Century, now housed in the Bowes Museum, Barnard Castle, County Durham, England. Fabergé probably saw the automaton when it was in display in Paris at the International Exposition of 1867 (World's fair).

Ownership 
Purchased by King Farouk of Egypt in 1949, the egg was later sold off by the Egyptian Revolutionary government in 1954 at the tragic Palace Collections Sale. This sale saw the dispersion of hundreds of Fabergé objects collected by the Egyptian Royal family. The egg was purchased by Wartski’s of London and later sold to the Fondation Edouard et Maurice Sandoz in Lausanne, Switzerland.

References

Sources

1906 works
Imperial Fabergé eggs